The 1998 United States Senate election in Washington was held November 3, 1998. Incumbent Democratic U.S. Senator Patty Murray won re-election to a second term.

Candidates

Democratic 
 Patty Murray, incumbent U.S. Senator

Republican 
 Linda Smith, U.S. Representative

Results 
The election was not close, with Murray winning by 16.8% of the vote. Murray won in a landslide victory by wracking up huge margins in Western Washington. Specifically, Murray trounced Smith in the state’s most populous county, King County. Murray also managed to win six counties in the historically conservative eastern part of the state. Murray was sworn in for a second term on January 3, 1999.

See also 
 1998 United States Senate elections

References 

Washington
1998
United States Senate